Henry W. Breyer Sr. House, also known as Haredith and officially known today as the Cheltenham Township Municipal Building, is a historic home located at Elkins Park, Montgomery County, Pennsylvania.  It was built in 1915, and is a large -story, irregularly shaped stone dwelling in the Colonial Revival style. It features a full-height porch supported by four Doric order columns.  Also on the property is a contributing garage.  The house was purchased by Cheltenham Township in 1956, and subsequently converted to offices. The house was built by Henry W. Breyer Sr., owner of Breyers Ice Cream.

It was added to the National Register of Historic Places in 2004. It is located across the street from National Historic Landmark Beth Sholom Synagogue.

Gallery

References

Houses on the National Register of Historic Places in Pennsylvania
Colonial Revival architecture in Pennsylvania
Houses completed in 1915
Houses in Montgomery County, Pennsylvania
Elkins Park, Pennsylvania
1915 establishments in Pennsylvania
National Register of Historic Places in Montgomery County, Pennsylvania